Swedish humanitarian aid to Norway during World War II, in Norway called  and in Sweden called , amounted to around SEK 71 million. High priority was extra food for schoolchildren in Norway. In 1944 more than 100,000 portions of soup were administered daily from almost 1,000 distribution centrals.

See also
Danish humanitarian aid to Norway during World War II

References

Norway in World War II
Sweden in World War II
Norway–Sweden relations
Humanitarian aid